Faisal Shahkar is a Pakistani police officer who served as the Inspector General (IGP) of Punjab Police. He was appointed to the post in July 2022, replacing his predecessor Rao Sardar. However, Shahkar resigned from his post in September 2022 due to personal reasons. In October 2022, he was appointed as an adviser to UN Police.

Career
After serving in various positions within the police force, Faisal Shahkar had a distinguished career in law enforcement. In October 2022, he was appointed as an adviser to UN Police, which is the global policing arm of the United Nations.

Shahkar's resignation came in the midst of political strife in Pakistan, as Prime Minister Imran Khan expressed his displeasure over delays in registering an FIR for an attack on him and his party leadership. The deadlock emerged as Imran wanted to include the names of Prime Minister Shehbaz Sharif, Federal Interior Minister Rana Sanaullah, and a senior military officer in the FIR. However, the provincial government opposed this.

The federal government subsequently allowed Shahkar to serve as a United Nations Police Advisor (D-2) in the Police Division Office of Rule of Law and Security Institution Department of Peace Operations at the United Nations Headquarters in New York on a deputation basis. The appointment was approved by Prime Minister Shehbaz Sharif and was effective until his superannuation date.

References

Living people
Inspector Generals of the Punjab Police (Pakistan)
Pakistani civil servants